This is a discography of NOFX, a California-based punk rock band. The band was formed in 1983 by vocalist and bassist Fat Mike, and guitarist Eric Melvin, drummer Erik Sandin joined them shortly afterwards. Their current second guitarist is El Hefe, who has been with the band since 1991.

To date, NOFX has released 14 studio full lengths, 17 EPs, and many 7" singles. The band rose to popularity in 1994 with their album Punk in Drublic, which was their only album to obtain gold status in the United States.

Studio albums

Live albums

Compilation albums

EPs

Singles

Split albums

Video albums

Music videos

References

Punk rock group discographies
Discographies of American artists
Discography